Tunisia competed at the 2016 Summer Olympics in Rio de Janeiro, Brazil, from 5 to 21 August 2016. Since the nation's official debut in 1960, Tunisian athletes have appeared in every edition of the Summer Olympic Games, except the 1980 Summer Olympics in Moscow because of the nation's partial support for the US-led boycott.

The Tunisian Olympic Committee fielded a team of 61 athletes, 40 men and 21 women, to compete in 17 sports at the Games. It was the nation's second-largest delegation sent to the Olympics, relatively smaller by 22 athletes than in London four years earlier.  Men's handball was the only team-based sport in which Tunisia qualified for the Games. Among the sports represented by the nation's athletes, Tunisia made its Olympic debut in beach volleyball, as well as returning to table tennis after a twelve-year absence.

The Tunisian roster was highlighted by two accomplished Olympians from London 2012: long-distance swimmer Oussama Mellouli and steeplechaser Habiba Ghribi. At 32 years old and headed to his fifth Games, Mellouli emerged himself as Tunisia's most successful Olympian of all time, with three medals (two golds and one bronze), and the first swimmer to dominate at both the pool and open water in Olympic history. Because of his successes, Mellouli was selected to carry the nation's flag at the opening ceremony. Meanwhile, Ghribi, a three-time Olympian, established a historic milestone for her country in London, when she became the first Tunisian woman to earn an Olympic medal.

Apart from Mellouli and Ghribi, 18 Tunisian athletes previously competed in London, including fencing sisters Azza and Sarra Besbes, tennis players Malek Jaziri and Ons Jabeur, three-time Olympic judoka Nihal Chikhrouhou (women's +78 kg) and Houda Miled (women's 70 kg), race walker Hassanine Sebei, and freestyle wrestler Marwa Amri.

Tunisia returned home from Rio de Janeiro with three bronze medals; each of them was awarded to the Tunisian athletes in fencing, taekwondo, and wrestling, respectively, for the first time. Moreover, it matched the overall tally achieved in London four years earlier. Among the medalists were Amri (women's 58 kg), three-time Olympic fencer Inès Boubakri (women's foil), and taekwondo fighter Oussama Oueslati (men's 80 kg).

Medalists

Athletics (track and field)

Tunisian athletes have so far achieved qualifying standards in the following athletics events (up to a maximum of 3 athletes in each event):

Seven athletes were named to Tunisia's track and field team for the Games, with Habiba Ghribi looking to defend her Olympic title in the women's 3000 m steeplechase.

Track & road events
Men

Women

Boxing

Tunisia has entered two boxers to compete in each of the following weight classes into the Olympic boxing tournament. Bilel Mhamdi and Hassen Chaktami had claimed their Olympic spots at the 2016 African Qualification Tournament in Yaoundé, Cameroon.

Canoeing

Sprint
Tunisia has qualified three boats for the following distances into the Olympic canoeing regatta through the 2016 African Sprint Qualifying Tournament.

Qualification Legend: FA = Qualify to final (medal); FB = Qualify to final B (non-medal)

Cycling

Road
Tunisia has qualified one rider in the men's Olympic road race by virtue of his top 10 individual ranking in the 2015 UCI Africa Tour.

Fencing

Tunisia has entered five fencers into the Olympic competition. Two-time Olympian Ines Boubakri had claimed a spot on the Tunisian team in the women's foil by finishing among the top 14 in the FIE Adjusted Official Rankings, while sisters Azza (women's sabre) and Sarra Besbes (women's épée) and debutant Mohamed Ayoub Ferjani (men's foil) did the same feat as the highest-ranked fencer coming from the Africa zone. Ferjani's brother Farès rounded out the Tunisian roster by virtue of a top finish in the men's sabre at the African Zonal Qualifier in Algiers, Algeria.

Handball

Summary

Men's tournament

Tunisia men's handball team qualified for the Olympics by virtue of a top two finish at the first meet of the Olympic Qualification Tournament in Gdańsk.

Team roster

Group play

Judo

Tunisia has qualified a total of four judokas for the following weight classes at the Games. Hela Ayari, Faicel Jaballah, and two-time Olympian Nihal Chikhrouhou were ranked among the top 22 eligible judokas for men and top 14 for women in the IJF World Ranking List of May 30, 2016, while Houda Miled at women's middleweight (70 kg) earned a continental quota spot from the African region, as the highest-ranked Tunisian judoka outside of direct qualifying position.

Rowing

Tunisia has qualified one boat each in the men's single sculls and the women's lightweight double sculls for the Games at the 2015 African Continental Qualification Regatta in Tunis.

Qualification Legend: FA=Final A (medal); FB=Final B (non-medal); FC=Final C (non-medal); FD=Final D (non-medal); FE=Final E (non-medal); FF=Final F (non-medal); SA/B=Semifinals A/B; SC/D=Semifinals C/D; SE/F=Semifinals E/F; QF=Quarterfinals; R=Repechage

Sailing

Tunisian sailors have qualified one boat in each of the following classes through the 2014 ISAF Sailing World Championships, the individual fleet Worlds, and African qualifying regattas.

M = Medal race; EL = Eliminated – did not advance into the medal race

Shooting

Tunisia has qualified one shooter in the women's pistol events by virtue of her best finish at the African Continental Championships and other selection competitions, as long as she obtained a minimum qualifying score (MQS) as of March 31, 2016.

Qualification Legend: Q = Qualify for the next round; q = Qualify for the bronze medal (shotgun)

Swimming

Tunisian swimmers have so far achieved qualifying standards in the following events (up to a maximum of 2 swimmers in each event at the Olympic Qualifying Time (OQT), and potentially 1 at the Olympic Selection Time (OST)):

Table tennis

Tunisia has entered one athlete into the table tennis competition at the Games. Saifa Saidani had claimed the Olympic spot in the women's singles by virtue of her top two finish at the 2016 African Qualification Tournament in Khartoum, Sudan.

Taekwondo

Tunisia entered three athletes into the taekwondo competition at the Olympics. Oussama Oueslati, Yassine Trabelsi, and Rahma Ben Ali secured the spots on the Tunisian team by virtue of their top two finish respectively in the men's welterweight (80 kg), men's heavyweight (+80 kg), and women's lightweight category (57 kg) at the 2016 African Qualification Tournament in Agadir, Morocco.

Tennis

Tunisia has entered two tennis players into the Olympic tournament. London 2012 Olympian Malek Jaziri (world no. 63) qualified directly for the men's singles as one of the top 56 eligible players in the ATP World Rankings as of June 6, 2016, while Ons Jabeur (world no. 188) had claimed one of six ITF Olympic women's singles places, as Africa's top-ranked player outside of direct qualifying position in the WTA World Rankings.

Volleyball

Beach
Tunisia has qualified the men's beach volleyball team for the Olympics by winning the CAVB Continental Cup final in Abuja, Nigeria, signifying the nation's Olympic debut in the sport.

Weightlifting

Tunisia has qualified one male and one female weightlifter for the Rio Olympics by virtue of a top five national finish (for men) and top four (for women), respectively, at the 2016 African Championships. The team must allocate these places to individual athletes by June 20, 2016.

Wrestling

Tunisia has qualified four wrestlers for each of the following weight classes into the Olympic competition, as a result of their semifinal triumphs at the 2016 African & Oceania Qualification Tournament.

Men's freestyle

Women's freestyle

References

External links 
 

Nations at the 2016 Summer Olympics
2016
Olympics